José Manuel "Pepe" Mangual Guilbe (born May 23, 1952) is a former Major League Baseball outfielder. He played for the Montreal Expos (1972–1976) and New York Mets (1976–1977).

Career
Mangual played one full season, in 1975 with the Expos. In that year he played in 140 games and hit .245 with a .340 on-base percentage. He also stole 33 bases, good for sixth place in the National League that year.

Midway through the 1976 season, on July 21, Mangual was traded by the Expos along with Jim Dwyer to the Mets for Wayne Garrett and Del Unser. Mangual was acquired to help the Mets in the play-off hunt, but only managed a .186 average the rest of the season. 8 At-bats into the next year Mangual was off the team. He toiled around in the minor leagues for another seven years until 1984 when he called it quits after spending the last seven years in the California Angels organization. Mangual's career minor league numbers were good, a .268 average with a .391 on-base percentage and 161 home runs and 303 stolen bases.

Personal life
Pepe Mangual's brother is another former MLB player, Ángel Mangual. His cousin is Coco Laboy.

External links

1952 births
Living people
Edmonton Trappers players
Major League Baseball outfielders
Major League Baseball players from Puerto Rico
Montreal Expos players
New York Mets players
Peninsula Whips players
Puerto Rican expatriate baseball players in Canada
Québec Carnavals players
Salt Lake City Gulls players
Spokane Indians players
Sportspeople from Ponce, Puerto Rico
Tidewater Tides players
Waterbury Angels players
West Palm Beach Expos players